Residencial Luis Lloréns Torres, also commonly known as Lloréns Torres, is a public housing complex in San Juan, Puerto Rico. It is located a few minutes driving distance from both the tourist and hotels areas of the Condado and Isla Verde neighborhoods, and from Luis Munoz Marin International Airport. It is also minutes away from the neighboring city of Carolina. Named after Puerto Rican independence advocate Luis Lloréns Torres, the complex is the largest housing and apartments complex in Puerto Rico, with some 2,600 residents accounted during the 2000 census. Other sources, such as Univision, say there are as many as 30,000 residents in the residencial. These residents occupy 2,000 apartments.

The complex is also known for its long standing drug trafficking situation. For decades, the residencial, along with others such as Residencial Nemesio Canales and Torres de Sabana, for example, has been a focus of the illegal drug trade in Puerto Rico, and there have been periodic rivalries between cartels operating at Luis Lloréns Torres and those other residenciales, as well as with cartels from other areas of the island.

History
Construction of the residencial began early in the 1950s. By 1953, construction was completed and the residencial opened its doors to new residents. The residencial was inaugurated on July 27 of 1953.

By the late 1980s, the residencial had begun suffering from drug gang activity. The situation has been a long-standing one, and by 2022, police interventions and arrests continued.

There have been attempts at improving the quality of life at the Residencial. During 2011, Puerto Rico Islanders association football players Marco Velez, Alexis Rivera and Noah Delgado visited, to teach children of the residencial association football skills. And, in 2013, members of rival drug gangs that operate in the residencial held a meeting to agree to a peace accord.

Notable residents
 Bizcocho - comedian, lived there 16 years

See also
 Residencial Las Casas -a nearby residencial and former commercial airport
 Public housing in Puerto Rico

References

1953 establishments in Puerto Rico
Crime in Puerto Rico
Buildings and structures in San Juan, Puerto Rico
San Juan, Puerto Rico